James Lent (1753 – August 11, 1838) was a judge and political figure in Nova Scotia. He represented Shelburne County in the Nova Scotia House of Assembly from 1806 to 1818.

He was baptized on February 25, 1753, in Tappan, New Jersey, the son of Adolph Lent and Katje Harring. In 1774, he married Breechje Schmitt. He was a loyalist during the American Revolution, serving with the New Jersey Volunteers. He later settled in Tusket, Nova Scotia. Lent served as a justice of the peace and a justice in the Inferior Court of Common Pleas for Yarmouth County. He died in Tusket at the age of 85.

His son Abraham and his grandsons Isaac Hatfield and Forman Hatfield also served in the provincial assembly.

References 
 A Directory of the Members of the Legislative Assembly of Nova Scotia, 1758-1958, Public Archives of Nova Scotia (1958)

1753 births
1838 deaths
Nova Scotia pre-Confederation MLAs
Colony of Nova Scotia judges